Lesueuria may refer to:
 Lesueuria (ctenophore), a genus of ctenophores in the family Bolinopsidae
 Lesueuria (alga), a genus of algae in the family Mastophoraceae
 Lesueuria, a genus of fishes in the family Gobiidae, synonym of Lesueurigobius